Perttu Hynönen (born September 16, 1994) is a Finnish ice hockey defenceman. He is currently playing with Peliitat Heinola in the Finnish Mestis.

Hynönen made his Liiga debut playing with Lahti Pelicans during the 2014–15 Liiga season.

References

External links

1994 births
Living people
Finnish ice hockey defencemen
HIFK (ice hockey) players
Lahti Pelicans players
People from Sotkamo
Sportspeople from Kainuu
21st-century Finnish people